Events in the year 1157 in Norway.

Incumbents
Monarchs – Eystein II Haraldsson, Inge I Haraldsson, Haakon II Sigurdsson

Events
King Eystein II of Norway was killed by supporters of his brother and co-ruler Inge I Haraldsson.

Births

Deaths
24 February – Jon Birgersson, Archbishop of Nidaros.
Eystein II Haraldsson, King of Norway from 1142 to 1157 (born c. 1125).

References

Norway